Ab Bad-e Kaleb Ali Khani (also Romanized as Āb Bād-e Kaleb ʿAlī Khānī) is a village in Khabar Rural District, in the Central District of Baft County, Kerman Province, Iran. At the 2006 census, its population was 56, in 12 families.

References 

Populated places in Baft County